Madhusudan may refer to:

 Madhusudanah, another name of the Hindu deity Vishnu
 Madhusudan (film), a 1941 Bollywood film

People 
 Madhusudan Gupta (1800–1856), Indian doctor
 Michael Madhusudan Dutt (1824–1873), 19th-century Indian poet and dramatist from Bengal
 Madhusudan Das (1848–1934), Orissan poet and freedom fighter
 Madhusudan Dhaky (1927–2016), Indian architectural and art historian from Gujarat
 Madhusudan Rao (1853–1912), Oriya poet known as "Bhaktakabi"
 V. Madhusudhana Rao (1923–2012), Telugu cinema director and script writer
 Madhusudan Mistry (born 1945), Indian politician from Gujarat
 Madhu Sudan (born 1966), Indian computer scientist
 M. D. Madhusudan, Indian wildlife biologist and ecologist
 Solipuram Madhusudhan Reddy (born 1940), Indian botanist
 Madhusudhan Rao (actor),  actor

See also
 Madhu (disambiguation)